The Algiers Accords of January 19, 1981 was a set of agreements between the United States and Iran to resolve the Iran hostage crisis, brokered by the Algerian government and signed in Algiers on January 19, 1981. The crisis arose from the takeover of the American embassy in Tehran on November 4, 1979, and the taking hostage of the American staff there. By this accord the 52 American citizens were set free and able to leave Iran.

Among its chief provisions are:
The US would not intervene politically or militarily in Iranian internal affairs;
The US would remove the freeze on Iranian assets and trade sanctions on Iran;
Both countries would end litigation between their respective governments and citizens, referring them instead to international arbitration, namely to the Iran–United States Claims Tribunal, created as a result of the agreement;
The US would ensure that US court decisions regarding the transfer of any property of the former Shah would be independent from "sovereign immunity principles" and would be enforced;
Iranian debts to US institutions would be paid.

The US chief negotiator was Deputy Secretary of State Warren Christopher, while the chief Algerian mediator was the Algerian Foreign Affairs Minister Mohammed Benyahia accompanied with a team of Algerian intelligence including Prime Minister Mohammed ben Ahmed Abdelghan and Mr Rashid Hassaine. The negotiations took place and the accords were signed at the Algiers home of the American ambassador, the Villa Montfeld.

Notes

References
 Full text of the declaration about the accords

External links

 Iran – United States Claims Tribunal

Iran hostage crisis
Algeria–Iran relations
Algeria–United States relations
Iran–United States relations
Treaties of the United States
History of Algiers
1981 in the United States
1981 in Iran
1981 in Africa
Treaties concluded in 1981
Treaties of Iran
Middle East peace efforts
Warren Christopher